A constitutional referendum was held in the Marshall Islands on 1 March 1979. The new constitution was approved by 63.8% of voters.

Results

References

Marshall Islands
1979 in the Marshall Islands
Referendums in the Marshall Islands
Constitutional referendums